Beth Bernstein is a Democratic member of the South Carolina House of Representatives, representing House District 78, Richland County, Columbia, SC.  She was first elected in November 2012.

Early life and education 
Bernstein was born on November 13, 1969, in Columbia, South Carolina, the daughter of Carol and Isadore Bernstein, both of whom are deceased.  Bernstein attended the University of Georgia graduating with a Bachelor of Arts degree in 1991.  She later earned a law degree from the University of South Carolina School of Law in 1994. Bernstein is licensed to practice in South Carolina state courts, United States District Court for South Carolina, United States Court of Appeals for the Fourth Circuit, and the United States Supreme Court. She practices law at Bernstein and Bernstein, Attorneys at Law, the firm her father founded in 1943.  She currently practices with her brother, Lowell Bernstein, and husband, Rip Sanders.

South Carolina House of Representatives 
In 2012, Beth successfully ran for the South Carolina House of Representatives House District 78. Currently, she serves on the House Judiciary Committee and was elected by the legislative body to serve as one of ten members on the House Ethics Committee.  She also was appointed by the Speaker of the House to serve on the Joint Legislative and Citizens Committee on Children.

Bernstein serves as Vice Chair of Richland County Legislative Delegation.

She has received the following awards during her legislative service: SCAAP Child Advocate Award, SmokeFreeSC Legislator of the Year, The Barbara Moxon Advocacy Award for championing women's issues;  the Legacy of Caring award from the USC College of Nursing; the Sierra Club of South Carolina Legislator of the Year award, and a Legislative Champion award from SC Coalition for Healthy Families.  She also received the John W. Williams, Jr. Distinguished Service Award from the Richland County Bar Association.

Personal life

Bernstein is the 5th of six children.  She has an identical twin sister, Anne Bernstein, who is a physician in Florida.  In 2003, Beth married Rip Sanders. They have two daughters, Caroline, 17, and Isabel, 13.  She attends Beth Shalom Synagogue.

References

External links
 
Legislative page
Twitter account

Living people
Democratic Party members of the South Carolina House of Representatives
Women state legislators in South Carolina
University of Georgia alumni
University of South Carolina alumni
1969 births
21st-century American politicians
21st-century American women politicians